The Treasure Houses of England group is a heritage consortium. It was founded in the early 1970s by nine of the foremost stately homes in England still in private ownership, with the aim of marketing and promoting themselves as tourist venues.

Houses 
Ten houses are currently in the group. These are (together with their location and historic owners):
Beaulieu Palace House in Hampshire (Barons Montagu of Beaulieu)
Blenheim Palace in Oxfordshire (Dukes of Marlborough)
Burghley House in Cambridgeshire (Marquesses of Exeter) – now overseen by Burghley House Preservation Trust Limited.
Castle Howard in North Yorkshire (Earls of Carlisle) – now overseen by a Howard family company, Castle Howard Estate Limited. 
Chatsworth House in Derbyshire (Dukes of Devonshire)
Harewood House in West Yorkshire (Earls of Harewood)
Hatfield House in Hertfordshire (Marquesses of Salisbury)
Holkham Hall in Norfolk (Earls of Leicester)
Leeds Castle in Kent (various families, ending with Olive, Lady Baillie) – now owned by Leeds Castle Foundation.
Woburn Abbey in Bedfordshire (Dukes of Bedford)

Gallery

See also
Historic Houses Association

References

External links
 Official website

Country houses in England
Historic house museums in England